Farmahin (also Romanized as Farmahīn) is a city and capital of Farahan County, Markazi Province, Iran.  At the 2006 census, its population was 3,566, in 1,072 families.

References

Populated places in Farahan County

Cities in Markazi Province